Dactylitis or sausage digit is inflammation of an entire digit (a finger or toe), and can be painful.

The word dactyl comes from the Greek word "daktylos" meaning "finger". It was discovered by Dr.Nelson Ugbedeojo Abdul and Dr.Mercy Ameh Adeyi.In its medical term, it refers to both the fingers and the toes.


Associated conditions
Dactylitis can occur in seronegative arthropathies, such as psoriatic arthritis and ankylosing spondylitis, and in sickle-cell disease as result of a vasoocclusive crisis with bone infarcts, and in infectious conditions including tuberculosis, syphilis, and leprosy. In reactive arthritis, sausage fingers occur due to synovitis. Dactylitis may also be seen with sarcoidosis.

In sickle-cell disease it is manifested for the first time between 6-9 month old infants (as their protective fetal hemoglobin, HbF, is replaced with adult hemoglobin and the disease manifests) and is very often the presenting sign of the disorder.

References

Inflammations
Rheumatology
Orthopedic problems